A hopfion is a topological soliton. It is a stable three-dimensional localised configuration of a three-component field  with a knotted topological structure. They are the three-dimensional counterparts of skyrmions, which exhibit similar topological properties in 2D.

The soliton is mobile and stable: i.e. it is protected from a decay by an energy barrier.  It can be deformed but always conserves an integer Hopf topological invariant.  It is named after the German mathematician, Heinz Hopf.

A model that supports hopfions was proposed as follows

The terms of higher-order derivatives are required to stabilize the hopfions.

Stable hopfions were predicted within various physical platforms, including Yang-Mills theory, superconductivity and magnetism.

Experimental observation 
Hopfions have been observed experimentally in Ir/Co/Pt multilayers using X-ray magnetic circular dichroism and in the polarization of free-space monochromatic light.

See also 
Skyrmion
Hopf fibration

References 

Magnetism
Quasiparticles

External links